A breakout character is a character in serial fiction, especially a member of an ensemble cast, who becomes much more prominent, popular, discussed, or imitated than expected by the creators. A breakout character may equal or overtake the other characters in popularity, including the protagonist. Prominent breakout characters often make cameo appearances in expanded franchises or feature as main characters in spin-off instalments of their own.

Animation

{| class="wikitable sortable"
|+
!Character
!Introduced in Animated Series
!Year Introduced
!Notes
|-
|Porky Pig 
|Looney Tunes (1930–present); Merrie Melodies (1931–present)
|1935
|Porky Pig (first voiced by Joe Dougherty, shortly thereafter replaced by Mel Blanc) debuted as a supporting character in an ensemble cast of new characters that included, among others, Beans the Cat. Only a year later, it became clear that audiences were more interested in Beans' stuttering sidekick, Porky Pig. After Westward Whoa, Beans and the others were phased out and Porky replaced him as the star of Looney Tunes. Looney Tunes itself was designed to be a showcase of music from the music publishers' record companies that Warner Bros. owned. By 1935, the show was overhauled to accommodate Porky Pig after the character increased in prominence. Porky Pig's popularity was also instrumental in facilitating the success of Looney Tunes merchandise for the next several decades.
|-
|Bugs Bunny
|Looney Tunes (1930–present); Merrie Melodies (1931–present)
|1938
|Bugs Bunny (first voiced by Mel Blanc) was originally envisioned as one of several potential foils for Porky Pig, alongside unsuccessful competitors including Gabby Goat and Petunia Pig. While Daffy Duck, who himself became a substantial star for Warner Bros., won that role, Bugs developed as a character in his own right by 1940 and became the biggest star in the Looney Tunes and Merrie Melodies shorts, developing his own cast of foils and starring in shorts for Warner Bros. until 1964. TV Guide identified Bugs as the greatest cartoon character in history in a 2002 listicle.
|-
|Woody Woodpecker
|Woody Woodpecker (1940–present)
|1940
|Woody Woodpecker began as an unnamed minor character in Knock Knock, a short film featuring Andy Panda who was then Universal's star character. Audiences liked him immediately, so he became the star of his own cartoons.
|-
|Yogi Bear
|The Huckleberry Hound Show (1958–1961)
|1958
|Yogi Bear (first voiced by Daws Butler) debuted in 1958 as a supporting character in one of three segments of The Huckleberry Hound Show. Yogi Bear's segment of the show became extremely popular and over time, overshadowed its titular character Huckleberry Hound in popularity. The first breakout character in animated television created by Hanna Barbera, Yogi Bear began starring in his own show by 1961, with Hokey Wolf taking his place on The Huckleberry Hound Show.
|-
|Bullwinkle J. Moose
|Rocky and His Friends (1959–1964)
|1959
|Bullwinkle J. Moose (voiced by Bill Scott) on Rocky and His Friends. Although the series was originally named for Rocky the Flying Squirrel, Rocky's dim-witted sidekick Bullwinkle got most of the jokes while Rocky served as straight man. By 1961, the series had been renamed The Bullwinkle Show, a title that appears for the last three seasons of the series.
|-
|Harley Quinn 
|Batman: The Animated Series (1992–1995)
|1992
|Harley Quinn (first voiced by Arleen Sorkin). She first appeared in Batman: The Animated Series in the 1992 episode "Joker's Favor" in what was originally supposed to be the animated equivalent of a walk-on role. She eventually became popular enough to become one of the most common recurring villains in the series, start appearing in the comics, earn a starring role in the 2016 film Suicide Squad and even receive her own animated series in 2019.
|-
|Broly
|Dragon Ball Z (1989–1996; films only)
|1993
|Broly is considered to be one of the most popular villains in the Dragon Ball series with a cult following, in spite of his origin as a non-canon character exclusive to the Dragon Ball animated film series as well as manga side stories. His popularity led to a rebooted canonical version of him starring in Dragon Ball Super: Broly.
|-
|Butters Stotch
|South Park (1997–present)
|1997
|Butters Stotch (Matt Stone) on South Park. Originally a background character in the show's pilot, the character eventually emerged as a submissive foil or victim of Eric Cartman's, and gradually became one of the show's most prominent characters, sometimes as the protagonist whose schemes drive the plots of episodes, as in "Franchise Prequel", or the character whose closing soliloquy provides the philosophical insight or "moment of clarity" that serves as the episode's thematic resolution, as in "Raisins", "Cartman Sucks", and "Butterballs".
|-
|Stewie Griffin 
|Family Guy (1999–2003, 2005–present)
|1999
|Stewie Griffin (voiced by Seth MacFarlane) on Family Guy. Creator Seth MacFarlane stated that he was very surprised that Stewie turned out to be the show's breakout character, and that this required him to write stories centering on him.
|-
|Bender
|Futurama (1999-2003, 2008-2013
|1999
|Bender Bending Rodríguez (voiced by John DiMaggio) on Futurama. Bender is largely considered the show's breakout character with DiMaggio's vocal performance being credited with helping boost Futurama's longevity and loyal fan base.
|-
|X-23
|X-Men: Evolution (2000–2003)
|2002
|X-23 first appeared in the self-titled tenth episode of the third season of the animated television series X-Men: Evolution, and is a clone and later adoptive daughter of Wolverine. X-Men: Evolution ended six episodes after X-23's second appearance, but she quickly developed a following and later made her first comic book appearance in the NYX comic series in 2004, followed by multiple comic book and video game appearances. In 2015, the character succeeded the original Wolverine and adopted his name and costume in the series All-New Wolverine, and is later portrayed by actress Dafne Keen in the 2017 film Logan in a scene-stealing performance.
|}

Books and prose

{| class="wikitable sortable"
|+
!Character
!Introduced in Book
!Year Introduced
!Notes
|-
|Ramona Quimby
|Henry Huggins
|1950
|Quimby was introduced as a minor character, initially the two-year-old sister of elementary school student Beezus Quimby, who in turn was a friend of the titular character of Henry Huggins in the works of author Beverly Cleary. Ramona quickly became the focal point of Cleary's subsequent books, particularly with 1968's Ramona the Pest. By the time of the fourteenth and final book in the Quimby/Huggins fictional universe, 1999's Ramona's World, Ramona has aged to ten years old.
|}

Comics

{| class="wikitable sortable"
|+
!Character
!Introduced in Comic(s)
!Year Introduced
!Notes
|-
|Krazy Kat
|The Dingbat Family (1910–1916)
|1910
|Krazy Kat evolved from an earlier comic strip of series artist George Herriman's, The Dingbat Family, which started in 1910 and was later renamed The Family Upstairs. This comic chronicled the Dingbats' attempts to avoid the mischief of the mysterious unseen family living in the apartment above theirs and to unmask that family. Herriman would complete the cartoons about the Dingbats, and finding himself with time left over in his 8-hour work day, filled the bottom of the strip with slapstick drawings of the upstairs family's mouse preying upon the Dingbats' cat. This "basement strip" became a daily comic strip with a title (running vertically down the side of the page) in 1913 and a black and white full-page Sunday cartoon three years later. Due to the objections of editors, who considered it unsuitable for the comics sections, Krazy Kat originally appeared in the Hearst papers' art and drama sections. Hearst himself, however, enjoyed the strip so much that he gave Herriman a lifetime contract and guaranteed the cartoonist complete creative freedom.
|-
|Popeye
|Thimble Theatre (1919–present)
|1929
|Popeye first appeared 10 years into the run of Thimble Theatre, a comic strip started in 1919 by E.C. "Elzie" Segar for the King Features Syndicate. During its first decade, the strip centered on the serialized escapades of ambitious, short-sighted entrepreneur Castor Oyl, his younger sister Olive Oyl and her boyfriend Ham Gravy. Segar introduced Popeye as a sailor hired by Castor and Ham to facilitate a single adventure. When the character disappeared from the strip afterwards, fans demanded his return, elevating him to a regular character by the end of 1929. As Popeye's prominence increased, Olive was recast as his girlfriend (facilitating Ham Gravy's disappearance in mid-1930), while Castor, initially retained as a lead character alongside Popeye, was relegated to tertiary status by the end of 1931, by which stage the strip's title was modified to  Thimble Theater, Starring Popeye in response to the sailor's ascendent popularity.
|-
|Nancy
|Fritzi Ritz (1922–1968)
|1933
|Nancy was introduced in 1933 in the comic strip Fritzi Ritz, which had debuted 11 years prior. Nancy soon emerged as a star in her own right, getting her own strip in 1938, while Fritzi Ritz's last strip would appear in 1968, becoming a supporting character in Nancy from then onward.
|-
|Snuffy Smith
|Take Barney Google, F'rinstance (1919–present; now Barney Google and Snuffy Smith)
|1934
|Snuffy Smith was introduced as a supporting character in 1934 to Take Barney Google, F'rinstance. He became so popular that he took over the comic strip as the main character of what is now titled Barney Google and Snuffy Smith.
|-
|Nero
|The Adventures of Nero (1947–2002)
|1947
|Nero from The Adventures of Nero by Marc Sleen was originally introduced as a side character in the series De Avonturen van Detective Van Zwam, where Detective Van Zwam was the main protagonist. From the first Van Zwam story on, Het Geheim van Matsuoka ("Matsuoka's Secret") (1947) readers reacted more enthusiastically to the dumb, lazy, vain and stubborn character Nero than the more noble and clever Van Zwam. So, from "De Hoed van Geeraard de Duivel" ("The Hat Of Gerard the Devil" (1950)) onward the series was named after Nero instead.
|-
|Scrooge McDuck
|Four Color Comics (1939–1962)
|1947
|Scrooge McDuck was originally intended as a one-off antagonistic supporting character in Christmas on Bear Mountain, a 1947 Donald Duck story by Carl Barks, first published in Four Color Comics #178. Scrooge McDuck's popularity grew so large that he spawned an entire mythology around the character, including new supporting characters, adventures, and life experiences as told by numerous authors. In 1952 he was given his own comic book series, Uncle Scrooge, which is still ongoing today. Several stories written by Barks and published in Uncle Scrooge were adapted as episodes of the popular syndicated television cartoon DuckTales in the late 1980s.
|-
|The Smurfs
|Johan and Peewit (1952–2001)
|1958
|The Smurfs were originally supporting characters in Peyo's comic series Johan and Peewit in 1958. The popularity of the little blue men led to them getting their own series a year later, which was subsequently followed by massive merchandising, a television series and various other productions.
|-
|Sabrina the Teenage Witch
|Archie's Madhouse (1959–1982)
|1962
|Sabrina the Teenage Witch was originally introduced as a one-off character in the Archie Comics universe in 1969. Unbeknownst to the original creators, Filmation was interested in the character and created a Saturday morning cartoon featuring Sabrina, helping the character become one of the most popular in the Archie Comics universe. Sabrina would get a second boost of popularity in the late 1990s with a prime time live-action Sabrina the Teenage Witch series, which starred Melissa Joan Hart in the title role.
|-
|The Punisher
|The Amazing Spider-Man (1963–present)
|1974
|The Punisher debuted as an antagonistic character in The Amazing Spider-Man #129 (February 1974). He was a hit with readers, and started to appear on a regular basis, teaming up with both Spider-Man and other heroes throughout the 1970s and 1980s. The Punisher's popularity took the character's creator, Gerry Conway by surprise, as he had intended him only as a second-tier character. The character evolved into an anti-hero and became one of Marvel's most popular characters in the 1990s, having a starring role in multiple comic book series, television series, films, and video games. His name, symbol, and image have been used for merchandise or appropriated for discussion of social issues.
|-
|Wolverine 
|The Incredible Hulk (1962–present)
|1974
|Wolverine is frequently cited as the first breakout character from the X-Men comics series, and "arguably the breakout character of the 1980s." He debuted in 1974's The Incredible Hulk #180 as a superhuman agent of the Canadian government who comes into conflict with the Hulk. He later appeared in 1975's Giant-Size X-Men #1, during writer Chris Claremont's first run with the X-Men, as one of several new recruits of the team. Wolverine was consistently the most popular member of the team; he headlined his first limited series in 1982, and later an ongoing solo series debuted in 1988, which eventually established Wolverine as one of Marvel's most important characters.
|-
|Elektra
|Daredevil (1964–present)
|1981
|Elektra debuted as a supporting character in Daredevil #168 (January 1981) as a love interest of the superhero Daredevil, and quickly broke out in popularity. Frank Miller, who created Elektra, secured a promise from Marvel's editors to stop using Elektra after he had concluded her storyline. Marvel abided by this agreement until the mid-1990s, when later editors and ownership groups decided to revive the character against Miller's wishes. The character remains one of Marvel's most popular female characters, with a starring role in two eponymous ongoing series, several mini-series, an eponymous live action film in 2005, as well as a major role in the 2003 film Daredevil and Marvel's Netflix television series.
|-
|Opus the Penguin
|Bloom County (1980–1989, 2015–present)
|1981
|Opus the Penguin, of Bloom County, Outland, and Opus, was originally featured in a two-week narrative in Bloom County in 1981. Fans requested more appearances of the penguin and series creator Berkeley Breathed was pleased with how well the character integrated with other characters in the strip. Opus was made a permanent character, displacing the original cast as the focus of the strip and its sequels. Another Berkeley Breathed creation, Bill the Cat, is also cited as a throwaway character which turned into a breakout success.
|-
|Venom
|The Amazing Spider-Man (1963–present)
|1984
|Venom was originally introduced as a living alien costume in The Amazing Spider-Man #252 (May 1984). The creature made its full first appearance with Eddie Brock as its host in The Amazing Spider-Man #300 (May 1988). Venom's popularity in the late 1980s and early 1990s inspired a series of symbiote characters published by Marvel comics, and the character eventually transitioned from a villain to an anti-hero, appearing as a principal character in a number of comic book series. The character has also appeared in numerous other media, including an eponymous live action film in 2018.
|-
|John Constantine 
|The Saga of Swamp Thing (1982–1999)
|1985
|John Constantine debuted as a supporting character who played a pivotal role in the "American Gothic" Swamp Thing storyline in 1985. Constantine was an instant breakout character, and received his own ongoing solo comic series in 1988. The Hellblazer series was the longest-running and most successful title of DC's Vertigo imprint. The character was adapted for a live-action film, a television show, novels, and multiple spin-offs and crossovers.
|-
|Vegeta
|Dragon Ball (1985–present)
|1988
|Vegeta debuted as a villain in Dragon Ball chapter #204 , in Weekly Shōnen Jump magazine on November 7, 1988. Vegeta's popularity among fans in Japan led to Dragon Ball's author, Akira Toriyama, to forgo his initial plan for Vegeta as a short lived villain. Toriyama included him more in the story, and Vegeta became one of Dragon Ball's most prominent characters.
|-
|Death (DC Comics)
|The Sandman (1989–present)
|1989
|Death (DC Comics) debuted in 1989 as a supporting character in Neil Gaiman's The Sandman. She is considered the breakout character of the entire Sandman series by multiple sources.
|-
|Deadpool
|The New Mutants (1982-present)
|1991
|Deadpool debuted as a villain in The New Mutants #98 (February 1991), and subsequently made guest appearances in issues of X-Force. The character's popularity led to the publication of his first solo comic, the four-issue limited series Deadpool: The Circle Chase on August 10, 1993. He is notable as one of the few breakout comic characters in the 1990s and 2000s, having a starring role in multiple comic series, a 2013 video game, and two live action eponymous films in 2016 and 2018.
|-
|Hit-Girl
|
|2008
|Hit-Girl is a breakout character from the Kick-Ass: The Dave Lizewski Years who went on to have her own comic book series.
|-
|Spider-Gwen
|Edge of Spider-Verse (2014–2015)
|2014
|An alternative universe version of Gwen Stacy, commonly referred to as Spider-Gwen, first appears in Edge of Spider-Verse #2 (September 2014) as part of the 2014–15 "Spider-Verse" comic book storyline, which features multiple alternative versions of Spider-Man that had appeared in various media. The character subsequently became one of comics' biggest breakout characters in recent years; the character is the lead heroine in her own ongoing comic book series, numerous animated television and video game appearances, as well as a co-starring role in the Academy Award-winning Spider-Man: Into the Spider-Verse. The character also inspired the creation of twenty Marvel variant covers of Gwen Stacy reimagined as a wide array of Marvel heroes in June 2015, spawning popular hybrid variants such as Gwenpool, a variant of Deadpool.
|-
|Doctor Aphra
|Star Wars: Darth Vader (2015–2016, 2016; 2017–2018; 2020–present)
|2015
|Doctor Aphra debuted as a supporting character in the 2015 Marvel Comics series Star Wars: Darth Vader, her popularity as a breakout character leading to crossovers in other comics, and then her own series, Doctor Aphra. Aphra is the first original Star Wars character not from the films to lead a Marvel comic series.
|}

Film

{| class="wikitable sortable"
|+
!Characters
!Introduced in Film or Film Series
!Year Introduced
!Notes
|-
|Inspector Jacques Clouseau
|The Pink Panther (1963–present)
|1963
|Inspector Jacques Clouseau, Peter Sellers' character in the Pink Panther film series, was originally conceived as a supporting character to David Niven's gentleman burglar Sir Charles Lytton in the film that launched the franchise, but quickly became the protagonist.
|-
|Boba Fett
|Star Wars (1977–present)
|1978
|Boba Fett was introduced in the 1978 Star Wars Holiday Special, before appearing in supporting roles in The Empire Strikes Back and Return of the Jedi. Though his screen time in the original Star Wars trilogy was minimal, and he apparently died an ignominious death in the third film, his visual design made him an iconic mainstay of the franchise. In the original Star Wars Expanded Universe, more commonly referred to as Star Wars: Legends, his character was established to have survived in the 1991 comics series Dark Empire. He also became a recurring character in Star Wars video games, including Bounty Hunter and the Battlefront series. His backstory would be provided in the 1999 – 2005 prequel trilogy, which gave rise to other Mandalorian characters, including Din Djarin in the television series The Mandalorian. Fett himself reappeared in that series, making his survival from the events of Jedi canonical. 
|-
|Aldous Snow
|Forgetting Sarah Marshall (2008)
|2008
|Aldous Snow, Russell Brand's character in Forgetting Sarah Marshall. He later appears in a starring role in the 2010 spin-off sequel Get Him to the Greek.
|-
|Phil Coulson
|Marvel Cinematic Universe (2008–present)
|2008
|Phil Coulson, portrayed by Clark Gregg in the Marvel Cinematic Universe, initially had a minor part in Iron Man (2008). This led to further recurring appearances in Iron Man 2 (2010), Thor (2011), and two Marvel One-Shots (2011), and The Avengers (2012) in which Coulson is murdered. The character is then revealed to be alive in the pilot episode of Agents of S.H.I.E.L.D., in which he was the main character. Other appearances included that series' digital spinoff, various tie-in comics, animated series, and Captain Marvel (2019).
|-
|The Minions
|Despicable Me (2010–present)
|2010
|The Minions became breakout characters in the 2010 animated film Despicable Me. They eventually starred in a 2015 spinoff, Minions.
|-
|Yondu Udonta
|Marvel Cinematic Universe (2008–present)
|2014
|Yondu Udonta, portrayed by Michael Rooker in the Marvel Cinematic Universe films Guardians of the Galaxy and Guardians of the Galaxy Vol. 2, was originally written as a supporting ally of the titular superhero team. Following the positive reception for the character in the first film, his role was upgraded significantly for the second, where he was considered by many critics to give a show-stealing performance.
|}

Radio

{| class="wikitable sortable"
|+
!Characters
!Introduced on Radio Program or Series
!Year Introduced
!Notes
|-
|Throckmorton Philharmonic Gildersleeve
|Fibber McGee & Molly (1935–1959)
|1939
|Throckmorton Philharmonic Gildersleeve (as portrayed by Harold Peary, later replaced by Willard Waterman in 1950) was an antagonist on the long-running radio comedy Fibber McGee & Molly around 1939. The pompous underwear salesman proved popular enough to warrant a spin-off, The Great Gildersleeve, in 1941. Like its parent show, Gildersleeve would go on to a long run in radio, film and (briefly) television; the last episode of Gildersleeve aired in 1958.
|}

Television

{| class="wikitable sortable"
|+
!Characters
!Introduced in TV Show
!Year Introduced
!Notes
|-
|Maynard G. Krebs
|The Many Loves of Dobie Gillis (1959–1963)
|1959
|Maynard G. Krebs (Bob Denver) on The Many Loves of Dobie Gillis, was originally created as a supporting character, the beatnik best friend of the titular character Dobie Gillis, when the series began in 1959. By 1960, Denver had graduated to co-lead and Maynard was given the bulk of the comedy material, with Dwayne Hickman's Dobie as the straight man. Dobie Gillis was Denver's first professional acting job, and the breakout success of the Maynard character led to Denver starring on Gilligan's Island after Dobie ended in 1963. Krebs was famously parodied as Shaggy Rogers (voiced by Casey Kasem) in the long-running Scooby-Doo franchise; Shaggy was largely an updated hippie reimagining of Krebs.
|-
|Spock
|Star Trek (1966–1969)
|1966
|Spock (Leonard Nimoy) on Star Trek was the only character to be carried over from the original pilot to the second. Series creator Gene Roddenberry was pressured by NBC to drop the character from the second pilot, then later to keep the character in the background. Spock's popularity grew, and NBC soon reversed its stance, encouraging more focus on the character. Spock appeared in every episode of the original series, the animated series and the original cast films.
|-
|J.J. Evans
|Good Times (1974-1979)
|1974
|J.J. Evans (Jimmie Walker) on Good Times, with his catchphrase "Dy-no-mite!", came to dominate the family series, leading to friction with stars Esther Rolle and John Amos, who played his parents. Amos and Rolle's concern was not so much that they resented being upstaged, but rather that they felt the J.J. character was too stereotypical and not a good role model for young African American viewers. A showdown with the show's producers in 1976 led to modification of the character, Amos' character being killed off and a temporary departure by Rolle from the show. Rolle returned at the beginning of the show's final season in 1978–79, and J.J. became an even stronger focus of the show.
|-
|Fonzie
|Happy Days (1974–1984)
|1974
|Fonzie (Henry Winkler) on the American sitcom Happy Days began in a supporting role, but quickly evolved into the focal point of the series. His character became the best friend to the main character, Richie Cunningham, displacing Potsie Weber's status as best friend. Winkler's billing in the credits rose to second (he refused to appear above Ron Howard, the star) and then first after Howard left the show to pursue directing. At one point, network executives hoped to retitle the show Fonzie's Happy Days.
|-
|K-9
|Doctor Who (1963–1989, 2005–present)
|1977
|K-9 (John Leeson and David Brierly) on Doctor Who, was a robotic dog who served as the Doctor's companion from 1977 to 1980. Following the character's departure, he appeared in the pilot for the aborted spin-off series K-9 and Company. He later appeared in three episodes of the revived series of Doctor Who, made appearances on the spin-off series The Sarah Jane Adventures, and was the central character in the spin-off series K-9.
|-
|J.R. Ewing
|Dallas (1978–1991, 2012–2014)
|1978
|J.R. Ewing (Larry Hagman) on Dallas. The initial concept of Dallas was a Romeo and Juliet-esque tale, focusing on two star-crossed lovers whose families are sworn enemies, with the amoral brother J.R. serving as a supporting character. However, the popularity of J.R. (and Hagman in the role) grew, and the producers acknowledged his new status as the series' breakout character. Two highly rated 1980 episodes became pop culture zeniths. In "A House Divided" and "Who Done It?", the audience witnessed J.R. being shot by an unknown assailant. After the cliffhanger was broadcast in March 1980, the audience was forced to wait until the October premiere of the next season for the cliffhanger's resolution. The summer of 1980 saw the emergence of a national obsession known as "Who shot J.R.?". Riding the crest of his newfound popularity, Larry Hagman threatened to leave the series unless his contractual demands were met. CBS leaked rumors of recasting, but Hagman eventually prevailed. As the series progressed, J.R. emerged as the central character until the show's cancellation in 1991, with Hagman serving as executive producer for the final few seasons. Hagman would go on to reprise the character in two television films and a revival series until Hagman's death in 2012.
|-
|Bob and Doug McKenzie
|SCTV (1976–1984)
|1980
|Bob and Doug McKenzie (portrayed by Rick Moranis and Dave Thomas respectively) were created as Canadian content filler for SCTV, appearing as hosts of the show-within-a-show "The Great White North" and improvising as two drunken stereotypical Canadians. The duo were spun off into the film Strange Brew, an album also titled The Great White North, and several appearances in other films and television shows. Their success also led to Moranis and Thomas being forced out of the SCTV cast in 1982 due to the other cast members becoming resentful of the duo's success. Particularly John Candy, who accused Thomas of using his head writer position to squash other characters and sketches in favor of more Bob and Doug.
|-
|Reverend I. M. Jolly 
|Scotch and Wry (1978–1992)
|1978
|Reverend I. M. Jolly was originally one of a series of ministers who hosted the final sketch, Last Call, on episodes of Rikki Fulton's Scotch and Wry. Jolly, the perpetually dour and ironically named minister, came to be the regular host of the segment, continuing as a Hogmanay feature for several years after Scotch and Wry ended. Gregor Fisher took over the role in 2019 for a one-off fortieth anniversary special but later expressed regret for doing so.
|-
|Elmo
|Sesame Street (1969–present)
|1980
|Elmo (voiced and operated by numerous puppeteers, but primarily by Kevin Clash from 1984 to 2012) on Sesame Street joined the cast of the children's show in the late 1970s. Originally a supporting character, Elmo's popularity among the show's younger fans rose in the 1990s, which led to him receiving his own segment within the show, "Elmo's World", and becoming a major marketing icon.
|-
|Alex P. Keaton
|Family Ties (1982–1989)
|1982
|Alex P. Keaton (Michael J. Fox) on Family Ties.
|-
|Dr. Frasier Crane
|Cheers (1982–1993)
|1984
|Dr. Frasier Crane (Kelsey Grammer) from Cheers debuted in the third season (1984–85) as a temporary release for some of the relationship tension between Sam and Diane, and was only meant to make guest appearances in a few episodes. He would instead remain as a recurring character, providing an upper-class foil to the otherwise working-class cast. He became a series regular by the show's fifth season. By 1993, the character would go on to headline Frasier, created as a spin-off from Cheers after its end.
|-
|Sandra Clark 
|227 (1985-1990)
|1985
|Sandra Clark (Jackée Harry) on 227. The series was originally intended as a vehicle for Marla Gibbs. Harry's character, however, proved to be a breakout success.
|-
|Sophia Petrillo
|The Golden Girls (1985–1992)
|1985
|Sophia Petrillo (Estelle Getty) on The Golden Girls, was the mother of lead character Dorothy Zbornak (Beatrice Arthur), and was originally written as a one-off character for the pilot. However, her blunt wisecracking became a signature of the show, to the point where she became a core member of the cast, replacing a gay chef named "Coco" who only appeared in the pilot. Petrillo would go on to appear in The Golden Palace and Empty Nest, with the character ending its run at the end of Empty Nest in 1995.
|-
|Joe Isuzu
|Isuzu commercials
|1986
|Joe Isuzu (David Leisure) was introduced in an effort from Japanese automaker Isuzu to make inroads in the American markets after several years of obscurity. Joe Isuzu, who began as a salesman who absurdly exaggerated the performance of the cars he was selling, was not only the most successful campaign Isuzu would run during its decade-long run in the United States market, but served as Leisure's breakout role, with the then-struggling actor parlaying his fame into a co-starring role on Empty Nest for several years and Leisure returning to the Joe Isuzu character several times after Isuzu discontinued it in 1991.
|-
|Worf
|Star Trek: The Next Generation (1987–1994)
|1987
|Worf (Michael Dorn) on Star Trek: The Next Generation was not meant to be anything but a background character. However, he became so popular that he became a main character, with entire episodes focused on him. He became a series regular on Star Trek: Deep Space Nine as soon as TNG went off the air. There were even plans to give him his own television show.
|-
|Steve Urkel
|Family Matters (1989–1998)
|1989
|Steve Urkel (Jaleel White) on Family Matters was originally a one-shot character during the show's first season in 1989. He became so popular that he became a regular cast member from season two forward, practically synonymous with the series.
|-
|Todd Manning
|One Life to Live (1963–2011, 2013)
|1992
|Todd Manning (originally and currently Roger Howarth, was played at one time by Trevor St. John) on One Life to Live, known for initiating the gang rape of Marty Saybrooke in 1993, was originally supposed to have a short-lived recurrence. However, once Howarth was seen to attract positive viewer reaction, the character was given a more primary focus. The character's popularity continued even after St. John assumed the role in 2003. (Note: St. John's version of the character was eventually rewritten as Todd's twin brother, Victor. Howarth returned as Todd in 2011.)
|-
|Tommy Oliver
|Power Rangers (1993–present)
|1993
|Tommy Oliver (Jason David Frank) from the live-action television franchise Power Rangers franchise was only intended to appear for one season. He became so popular that in subsequent seasons, he was made a series regular. He eventually became the most enduring character in the franchise.
|-
|Mr Blobby
|Noel's House Party (1991–1999)
|1993
|Mr Blobby (portrayed by Barry Killerby) on Noel's House Party became a British national phenomenon upon his debut in 1993; he quickly became a source of ridicule and national embarrassment as time progressed.
|-
|Robert Barone
|Everybody Loves Raymond (1996–2005)
|1996
|Robert Barone (Brad Garrett) on Everybody Loves Raymond was credited with being the show's "secret weapon" and the main catalyst for most of the show's "comic high points."
|-
|Spike
|Buffy the Vampire Slayer (1997–2003)
|1997
|Spike (James Marsters) on Buffy the Vampire Slayer was originally intended to be a villain for a few episodes. However, the character became a recurring one through the end of the second season, and then a main character in the fourth season. He appeared regularly through the end of the series, then appeared as a main character during the final season of Angel.
|-
|Chloe O'Brian
|24 (2001–2010)
|2003
|Chloe O'Brian (Mary Lynn Rajskub) on 24. Rajskub's character was introduced during the third season of the series. She initially appeared as a recurring character throughout seasons three and four, before being promoted to a series regular in season five. She continued in that role until season eight, as well as reprising her role in 24: Live Another Day. By season six, Rajskub had become the second-billed cast member after lead actor Kiefer Sutherland and has second most appearances of any character after Jack Bauer. During her tenure on the series, Chloe becomes one of Jack's closest friends and allies and is considered a "fan-favorite". She has been included in AOL's list of the "100 Most Memorable Female TV Characters".
|-
|Carson Beckett
|Stargate Atlantis (2004–2009)
|2004
|Carson Beckett, portrayed by Paul McGillion on Stargate Atlantis, was introduced in the pilot episode, originally intended to be an occasional guest star for scenes requiring a doctor. His character was an immediate hit with the fans from inception, and Beckett earned his own episode halfway through Season 1. He was upgraded to a regular in Season 2, becoming one of the six main characters and appearing in 15 episodes of the season. Despite his popularity, however, the character was killed off at the end of Season 3. This led to outrage among his fans, who campaigned so heavily for his return that the character was written back into the series a year later. He became a recurring character once again during the show's fourth and fifth seasons.
|-
|Barney Stinson
|How I Met Your Mother (2005–2014)
|2005
|Barney Stinson (Neil Patrick Harris) on How I Met Your Mother. Over time, Stinson became a scene-stealer and has been credited for much of the show's success.
|-
|London Tipton
|The Suite Life of Zack & Cody (2005–2008)
|2005
|London Tipton (Brenda Song) on The Suite Life of Zack & Cody and its spin-off The Suite Life on Deck.
|-
|Kenneth Parcell
|30 Rock (2006–2013)
|2006
|Kenneth Parcell (Jack McBrayer) on 30 Rock. Originally a peripheral character in the first season, the eternally cheerful NBC Page moved into the main cast beginning in season two, and McBrayer received an Emmy nomination for Outstanding Supporting Actor in a Comedy Series in 2009.
|-
|Andy Bernard
|The Office (2005–2013)
|2006
|Andy Bernard (Ed Helms) on The Office was originally signed to appear in 10 episodes during the show's third season. Realizing that Helms had similarities with the character they were creating, the producers gradually merged the two. Bernard became a series regular when the Stamford and Scranton branches were merged in the show's storyline. In the eighth season, Andy replaced Michael Scott as the regional manager of the branch when Steve Carell left the show.
|-
|Benjamin Linus 
|Lost (2004–2010)
|2006
|Benjamin Linus (Michael Emerson) in Lost was originally only supposed to be in three episodes of Season 2 in the fake persona of "Henry Gale", but the producers enjoyed the actor's performance so much that they wrote him in as the leader of the Others. He became a series regular in Season 3 and remained a star character for the rest of the show. During the series' run, Linus was often hailed as one of the best villains on television, and Emerson was nominated for three Emmys, winning one for Outstanding Supporting Actor in a Drama Series.
|-
|Sheldon Cooper
|The Big Bang Theory  (2007–2019)
|2007
|Sheldon Cooper (Jim Parsons) on The Big Bang Theory and Iain Armitage on Young Sheldon (2017–2022). In a June 2022 column TV Guide writer Matt Roush, responding to a question regarding whether other characters from The Big Bang Theory would receive their own spinoffs, stated that Sheldon was given one because he was the star's "breakout character", but that spinoffs for other characters were not likely.
|
|-
|Blair Waldorf
|Gossip Girl (2007–2012)
|2007
|Blair Waldorf (Leighton Meester) on Gossip Girl was the series' most critically acclaimed character, earning mainstream media recognition from Forbes, Rolling Stone, Variety, and numerous other periodicals. The character was acclaimed as having "stolen the spotlight" in the first season. Her wardrobe garnered real-life coverage from fashion outlets, and she has been cited as a trend-setter outside of the show.
|-
|Castiel
|Supernatural (2005–2020)
|2008
|Castiel (Misha Collins) on Supernatural is noted for originally being conceived for a short six-episode story arc at the beginning of the show's fourth season. By the time the fourth season came to a close, not only had the character quickly become a favorite amongst fans, but he was subsequently upgraded from his previous supporting status to a series star alongside the show's main protagonists Sam Winchester and Dean Winchester from the show's fifth season onward.
|-
|Saul Goodman
|Breaking Bad (2008–2013)
|2009
|Saul Goodman (Bob Odenkirk) was originally conceived as a joke character for three episodes of Breaking Bads second season, but after seeing his performance and contribution to the show's dynamic, showrunner Vince Gilligan decided to turn him into a lead character for the spin-off series Better Call Saul. 
|-
|Ron Swanson
|Parks and Recreation (2009–2015)
|2009
|Ron Swanson (Nick Offerman) on Parks and Recreation. Originally a background character, he soon became what critics called the show's "secret weapon", and a scene-stealer, noted for his frequent deadpan comedy and machismo.
|-
|Daryl Dixon
|The Walking Dead (2010–2022)
|2010
|Daryl Dixon (Norman Reedus) on The Walking Dead. An original character created for the television series, who did not originate in the comics source material. His popularity grew to such an extent that he has been featured in two video games (The Walking Dead: Survival Instinct and The Walking Dead: Onslaught) and it was reported in September 2020 that he would star in a spin-off show. His popularity grew to the point that fans questioned whether he would be adapted into the comics series, though creator Robert Kirkman indicated that he had no plans do so, as he preferred the idea of certain characters maintaining their unique relationshihp to specific mediums.
|-
|Elka Ostrovsky
|Hot in Cleveland (2010–2015)
|2010
|Elka Ostrovsky was portrayed (by Betty White) on Hot in Cleveland. White was originally offered a guest role in the pilot episode, but her popularity prompted the producers to give her a permanent lead role.
|-
|Elijah Mikaelson
|The Vampire Diaries (2009–2017)
|2010
|Elijah Mikaelson (Daniel Gillies) on The Vampire Diaries and The Originals, was originally brought in as a minor threat for the main characters and as a way to introduce villain Klaus. He was then supposed to die after six episodes. However, the character became so immensely popular that the writers changed his storyline, revealing him to be Klaus' brother. He became an important ally to the main characters and continued to recur on the show. Gillies then brought the character over to the spin-off The Originals, where Elijah has become one of the main characters.
|-
|Schmidt
|New Girl (2011–2018)
|2011
|Schmidt (Max Greenfield) on New Girl (2011–2018).
|-
|Felicity Smoak
|Arrow (2012–2020)
|2012
|Felicity Smoak (Emily Bett Rickards) on Arrow was introduced as an IT consultant at the main character's company midway through the first season. She quickly became a fan favorite and was made a series regular for the second season, with DC comics re-imagining her character for the New 52 as a facsimile of the live-action one.
|-
|Sara Lance 
|Arrow (2012–2020)
|2012
|Sara Lance (Caity Lotz) in Arrow and Legends of Tomorrow is an original character and the sister of Laurel Lance. Originally thought to have died in events prior to the show's first episode, Sara showed up in Star City alive in season 2, having assumed the vigilante identity Canary. She joins Team Arrow for a while, until she is killed off in the season 3 premiere, thus paving way for Laurel to assume her identity and become the Black Canary. By this time, Sara had proven to be very popular with fans and critics, and her death led to outrage amongst the fans, especially when her mantle as the Canary was given to Laurel. Sara was eventually brought back to life in season 4, and ultimately went on to star as one of the leads in the Arrow spin-off Legends of Tomorrow.
|-
|Mellie Grant
|Scandal (2012–2018)
|2012
|Mellie Grant portrayed by Bellamy Young on Scandal. Originally a recurring character meant to appear in only three episodes of the first season, the role of Mellie ended up appearing in every episode. She became a main cast member by the second season, and by the third season was described by many as the breakout character of the show. As of the seventh and final season, she has risen from being merely the First Lady, then a U.S. Senator representing Virginia, to President of the United States, succeeding her husband. Praised from the start as a villainous scene stealer, Mellie eventually became much more developed and eventually integral to show. Young received major acclaim for her performance, with one critic going so far as to say, "In Mellie, the show has its most fleshed-out character and in Young, its most compelling performer."
|-
|Wheeler Walker, Jr.
|The Ben Show (2013)
|2013
|Walker, a comically vulgar country singer, was the creation of comedian Ben Hoffman and originally debuted as a one-off fictional persona for an episode of his short-lived mockumentary series The Ben Show. In 2016, Hoffman resurrected the character and recorded an independent record in character as Walker. The record became an underground success, prompting subsequent Walker albums; Hoffman has appeared as Walker alongside real-life alternative country and country rock artists  and has used the Walker character to defend traditional country music, including a protest against an exhibit at the Country Music Hall of Fame profiling the group Florida Georgia Line in 2022. 
|-
|Oswald Cobblepot
|Gotham
|2014
|This adaptation of DC Comics supervillain, the Penguin, emerged as a breakout character from test screenings of the pilot.
|-
|Steve Harrington
|Stranger Things (2016–present)
|2016
|Steve Harrington, initially portrayed as a rude, stereotypical high school boyfriend in Stranger Things, evolved over the course of the series into a kind-hearted, empathetic, and charismatic character that has become a fan-favorite.
|-
|Rich DotCom
|Blindspot (2015–2020)
|2016
|Rich DotCom (Ennis Esmer) first appeared in the ninth episode of Blindspot, after creator Martin Gero realized that the James Bond-esque villain introduced in the original draft was not working. Although initially introduced as a Dark Web confronted by the FBI, he was brought back for subsequent episodes, in which his character was further developed, and revealed to be more morally complex than initially portrayed. Gero eventually realized Rich had become an integral part of the show having come to regard him as the defining character of the series.
|-
|Christopher Pike
|Star Trek (1964–present)
|1964 (breakout status in 2019)
|Christopher Pike, played by Jeffrey Hunter, was introduced in "The Cage," the 1964 pilot of Star Trek: The Original Series. However, Hunter declined the role when the show went to series, and the character was replaced by James T. Kirk (William Shatner). A crippled Pike, now played by Sean Kenney, would later make a guest appearance in "The Menagerie", which incorporated footage from "The Cage" featuring Hunter. The character would later play a supporting role in the feature films of the 2000s, played by Bruce Greenwood. He would subsequently be made a supporting character in Star Trek: Discovery in 2019, in which he was played by Anson Mount. Pike became a breakout character whose popularity among fans was attributed by critics to Mount's portrayal. Mount was contracted for only one season, but fans began a petition for his own spin-off. On May 15, 2020, CBS officially announced Star Trek: Strange New Worlds, a new television series starring Mount as Pike. Creator and executive producer Alex Kurtzman cited overwhelming positive fan response as one of the reasons for creating the show.
|-
|Grogu
|The Mandalorian (2019–present)
|2019
|Grogu, unofficially referred to as Baby Yoda by fans and the media since its name would not be revealed until well into the second season, made his debut in the first episode of The Mandalorian and subsequently received significant media attention due to the numerous internet memes he spawned and the high demand but low supply of available merchandise of the character.
|}

Video games

References

Television terminology
Breakout